Xylophanes staudingeri is a moth of the  family Sphingidae. It is known from Panama, Guatemala and Nicaragua.

It is similar to Xylophanes cyrene but deep green.

References

staudingeri
Moths described in 1894